Ian Gatley was the former Provost and Senior Vice President for Academic Affairs of New Jersey Institute of Technology (NJIT) in Newark, New Jersey.He is also a Distinguished Professor of Physics in the department of Physics at the College of Science and Liberal Arts in NJIT.
He is a prolific scholar well known in Astronomy and Imaging Science.

Education
Gatley received his BS (first-class honors) in Physics (1972) from the University of London (Imperial College).
He earned his PhD in Physics (1978) from California Institute of Technology where he studied under Eric Becklin, Michael Werner and Gerry Neugebauer on board NASA’s Kuiper Airborne Observatory.

Career
After getting his doctoral degree, Gatley became an Astronomer at United Kingdom Infrared Telescope in Hilo Hawaii in 1979. He was a Senior Principal Scientific Officer in 1986 before he left it to work as an Astronomer at the US National Optical Astronomy Observatories (NOAO) in Tucson Arizona.  

His team also developed the first color infrared camera for Kitt Peak National Observatory in collaboration with the Space Telescope Science Institute.

Gatley left NOAO for Rochester Institute of Technology in 1997 where he held several positions over his tenure including: Director of Chester F. Carlson Center for Imaging Science (1997), Dean of the College of Science, and  Director of the Center for Student Innovation and Undergraduate Research Support (2009).  In May 2010 he was appointed Provost and Senior Vice President for Academic Affairs at New Jersey Institute of Technology which operates the Big Bear Solar Observatory (optical), and the Owens Valley Solar Array (radio), and served until December 2012 in that role.

References

External links
'NJIT : Ian Gatley, of RIT, Named New NJIT Provost and Senior VP Academic Affairs'

Year of birth missing (living people)
Living people
Alumni of Imperial College London
Rochester Institute of Technology faculty
California Institute of Technology alumni
New Jersey Institute of Technology